Judge Whaley may refer to:

Henry H. Whaley (c. 1818–after 1888), associate judge of the Court of Sessions for San Diego County, California
Richard S. Whaley (1874–1951), judge of the United States Court of Claims
Robert H. Whaley (born 1943), judge of the United States District Court for the Eastern District of Washington